Qeshlaq-e Hoseynabad (also Romanized as Qeshlāq-e Ḩoseynābād and Qeshlāq Ḩoseynābād) is a village in Qareh Chay Rural District, in the Central District of Saveh County, Markazi Province, Iran. At the 2006 census, its population was 50, in 14 families.

References 

Populated places in Saveh County